Jihad is an Arabic word for "struggle" and a theological and legal concept in Islam.

Jihad or variant spellings may also refer to:

Arts, entertainment, and media

Literature
  Jehad, a 1984 novel by Simon Hawke (as Nicholas Yermakov)
 Jihad: The Trail of Political Islam, by Gilles Kepel, 2000

Music
 Jihad (EP), by Otep, 2001
 "Jihad" (song), by Slayer, 2006
 "Jihad", a theme for Baldr Sky Dive 2, by Kotoko
 Jihad / Freezing Moon, a split album by The Meads of Asphodel and Mayhem, 2002
 Jihad (Points of Order), an album by Automaton, 1994
 Jihad, a song by D-A-D, 1989

Other uses in arts, entertainment, and media
 Jihad (comics) or Onslaught, a fictional mercenary team 
 Dhijad (film), 2006
  Jihad! The Musical, a musical comedy and jihad satire, 2007
 "The Jihad", an episode of Star Trek: The Animated Series

Places
 Jehad, Iran
 Al Gihad, Libya
 Al-Jihad (Baghdad)

Other uses
 Jihad (name)
 Al-Jihad SC, a Syrian football club
 Al Jihad SC, the former name of AC Sporting, a Lebanese football club

See also
 
 Cihat, a Turkish given name
 Ijtihad, the "struggle" of coming to a just verdict in jurisdiction
 Islamic Jihad (disambiguation)
 Jihadism
 Jyhad, a card game
 Mujahid (disambiguation)
 Mujahideen (disambiguation)